Remembering Stan Rogers: An East Coast Tribute is a tribute album to Canadian folk singer-songwriter Stan Rogers, released in 1995 on EMI Music Canada. The album was recorded live over two nights of concert performances at Halifax's Rebecca Cohn Auditorium on April 23 and 24, 1995. In 1996 a second volume was released, An East Coast Tribute II, which featured fourteen more performances from this tribute concert.

Track listing
An East Coast Tribute
 The Irish Descendants, "The Mary Ellen Carter"
 Rita & Mary Rankin, "Tiny Fish for Japan"
 Terry Kelly, "Fogarty's Cove"
 Ian McKinnon and Joey Kitson, "You Can't Stay Here"
 Evans & Doherty, "The Lock-Keeper"
 Debbie Adshade, "Harris and the Mare"
 Les Méchants Maquereaux, "Acadian Saturday Night"
 Lennie Gallant, "Make and Break Harbour"
 John Allan Cameron, "Guitar Instrumental"
 Laura Smith, "Song of the Candle"
 Matt Minglewood, "Forty-Five Years"
 Modabo, "Northwest Passage"
 Bruce Guthro, "Stan's Tune"

An East Coast Tribute II
 Rita & Mary Rankin, "The Wreck of the Athens Queen"
 The Irish Descendants, "Sailor's Rest"
 Terry Kelly, "The Bluenose"
 Ian McKinnon and Joey Kitson, "The Jeannie C."
 Evans & Doherty, "White Squall"
 Debbie Adshade, "Giant"
 Lennie Gallant, "Fisherman's Wharf"
 McGinty, "Rolling Down to Old Maui"
 Sweet Absalon, "The Flowers of Bermuda"
 Laura Smith, "Delivery Delayed"
 Matt Minglewood, "Working Joe"
 Modabo, "Oh No, Not I"
 Bruce Guthro, "So Blue"
 Cast, "Barrett's Privateers"

Chart performance
An East Coast Tribute II

References

Tribute albums
Compilation albums by Canadian artists
1995 compilation albums
Folk compilation albums